Stefano Cilio (23 November 1980) is an Italian musician, writer, radio personality and journalist.

Biography 
Cilio graduated in economics at Università Bocconi of Milan. 

Mezzo Secolo, his first book, earned positive reviews from music publications Rockol and Sentireascoltare as well as from radio stations RTL 102.5, Radio Monte Carlo and m2o. A quiz based on the book with the same name is developed on the Mollybeach program, which is presented by disc jockey and record producer Molella.

In 2019, a new version of the book is published by music publisher Arcana Edizioni, with data updating until 2018. This edition was positively reviewed by national magazine Sette, by Radiocity and by Radio Capital, which hosted the author in one of its main programs.

Cilio created a popularity music chart named Rit Parade, that allowed him to host a weekly radio chart, aired by Radio Italia Anni 60 (909.000 daily listeners) and by some local radios like BluRadio (16.000 daily listeners) and Radio Shake Hit (66.000 daily listeners). Rit Parade lists the 30 most popular songs in Italy combining streaming, download, airplay, internet views and identification data. From May 2021 to March 2022 the chart was aired by NBC Rete Regione, the most important radio in Trentino-Alto Adige with more than 100,000 daily listeners. Since March 2022 the chart has been aired by Radio Cusano Campus, a national radio available all over Italy.

In 2020, he began his journalism career writing weekly articles for the magazine Tutto Settimanale: in the music section of the magazine he comments on the top ten positions of the Rit Parade, providing details and information about songs and artists inside the chart. He also started a collaboration with Italian website Rockol, the most viewed Italian music news site and one of the top 100 most viewed websites in Italy (the only music website in this particular chart).

In May 2021, he released his debut music single “Glance”. The song got more than 5 million streams worldwide and was granted with a platinum record by IFPI for selling more than 30.000 copies in Austria. Additionally the song was awarded a gold record by Mahasz in Hungary after reaching more than 500.000 premium streams and another gold record by RISA in South Africa for selling over 10.000 copies.

His second single “Tonight” was released in October 2021 and went on to number 1 spot on Spotify in Romania on two different occasions in November, making him the first Italian solo project to reach this milestone in Romania. In 2022 “Tonight” was awarded a platinum record in South Africa and a gold record in Hungary

Third single “Breathless” was released in January 2022 and it is his first pop song. The song won a platinum record in Hungary and a gold record in Austria.

In April 2022, Cilio released “Queen”, his fourth single. In May the song entered the Italian Shazam Chart reaching number 16 and went on to number 23 of the global worldwide Shazam electronic chart. It also reached number 1 in the Italian Shazam Discovery Chart.

See also 
 Record chart
 List of record charts
 List of music recording certifications

References

External links 
 Radio Monte Carlo interviews Stefano Cilio
 Stefano Cilio reviewed by Rockol
 Sentire Ascoltare reviews Stefano Cilio
 Stefano Cilio interviewed by Radio Capital
 L’esordio discografico di Stefano Cilio
 Un italiano alla conquista dell’Austria
 Stefano Cilio, altri 2 dischi d’oro
 RISA South African Certifications
 IFPI Austria Certifications
 Mahasz Hungary Certifications
 Stefano Cilio is making highlights
 Stefano Cilio ready to make people “Breathless”
 Stefano Cilio, the Italian music producer

1980 births
People from Milan
Italian male writers
Living people
Italian radio presenters
Italian radio personalities
Bocconi University alumni
Italian male musicians
Music award winners